Anju Kumari Yadav is a Nepalese politician who is elected member of Provincial Assembly of Madhesh Province from People's Socialist Party, Nepal. Yadav is a resident of Birgunj, Parsa.

References

Living people
Members of the Provincial Assembly of Madhesh Province
Madhesi people
People from Birgunj
People's Socialist Party, Nepal politicians
Year of birth missing (living people)